Çerkes Halil Efendi, also known as Haci Halil Efendi ("Haci" being a title for people who have done the pilgrimage to Mecca) was an Ottoman Sheikh ul-Islam, the 137th, from 1819 until 1821.

When the Greek War of Independence began in 1821 and the plans of the Filiki Eteria were revealed, the Ottoman Sultan Mahmud II ordered Haci Halil to approve a special command (fatwā), according to which the Ottoman army was allowed to kill the Greek citizens of Istanbul in order to suppress the revolution. Haci Halil asked for more time in order to discuss the issue with the Greek Orthodox Patriarch Gregory V.

The Patriarch had already excommunicated the revolution three times, so after he assured Haci Halil that the clerics and himself had nothing to do with the revolt, he begged him to protect them.

Haci Halil asked for the Sultan to separate the innocent from the guilty, as it was written in the Quran, and denied to approve the fatwa. Then the Sultan, enraged, removed Haci Halil from his position and banned him to the island of Lemnos.

However, before his departure he was tortured and bled to death, leaving his last breath in Constantinople (Istanbul).

References
  - English abstract included

Notes

19th-century people from the Ottoman Empire
1821 deaths
Turkish torture victims
Executed people from the Ottoman Empire
Year of birth missing
People executed by torture
Islamic scholars from the Ottoman Empire
Shaykh al-Islāms
Sheikh-ul-Islams of the Ottoman Empire